Native video is video that is uploaded to or created on social networks and played in-feed, as opposed to links to videos hosted on other sites. Native video formats are specific to each social platform and are designed to maximise video engagement (i.e. number of views), discovery and distribution. The most widely used native video platforms include Facebook, Twitter and YouTube.

References 

Real-time web
Social media
Mobile content
Advertising